The 2018 Bandy World Championship was the 38th Bandy World Championship between men's bandy teams. The tournament took place in China and Russia. Division A matches were played in the Russian city of Khabarovsk and Division B matches in Harbin, Heilongjiang, China.

Participating teams and officials 

Eight nations were qualified for the Division A, where the matches were played in Khabarovsk, Russia. Canada would have made its return to Division A, as it won in the Division B last year, but declined to participate and was replaced by Hungary. The other teams in Division A were directly qualified through their results in the same division last year.

The Division B matches were played in Harbin, Manchuria, and made up of eight teams. Of the countries from 2017, Belarus, which finished in last place of Division A, and the Czech Republic, chose not to participate.

Division A

Pool A

Pool B

Division B

Pool A

Pool B

Officials

Squads

Venues

Division A

Preliminary round 
All times are local (UTC+10).

Group A

Group B

Play-off

Bracket

Quarterfinals

7th place game

5th place game

Semifinals

Third place game

Final

Final ranking

Division B

Preliminary round 
All times are local (UTC+8).

Group A

Group B

Play-off

Bracket

Quarterfinals

7th place game

5th place game

Semifinals

Third place game

Final

Final ranking

External links
Official site Division A
Official site Division B

References

2018
World Championship
2018 in Russian sport
2018 in Chinese sport
World Championships,2018
World Championships,2018
2018
2018
January 2018 sports events in Russia
February 2018 sports events in Russia